CCSTV New Year's Gala is a low-budget, three-hour New Year's Gala program organized by Shi Mengqi (施孟奇) of China Country Side TV (CCSTV). It is the grassroots shanzhai version of the official CCTV New Year's Gala.

Organization
CCSTV and its New Year's Gala is organized by Beijing-based cameraman Shi Mengqi. In an interview with Beijing Today, Shi criticized the CCTV New Year's Gala, saying that he had attended the CCTV New Year's Gala one year, but that it is "not designed for the ordinary viewer [...] The audience was nothing but high officials and rich people.

Since the announcement of CCSTV, 10 volunteers have joined Shi to organize the program, assisting with items such as programming, auditing, and soliciting sponsors. 700 groups and individuals have sent Shi applicants to be considered for the three-hour program, and over 30 segments were scheduled for the program by the end of December 2008. Amongst the performers scheduled are the "Bike King of the East" Zhou Changchun (周长春), who will perform bicycle tricks.

Social Response
National satellite station Guizhou TV initially offered venues and support for the CCSTV New Year's Gala, stating that they "just want to provide an alternative for people who cannot go home during Spring Festival." However, CCSTV decided to part with Guizhou TV, though there is a possibility for performers from the program to work with Guizhou TV after the Gala, and some parts of the Gala may be later broadcast on Guizhou TV.

An online survey conducted by the popular Chinese forum Tianya found that over half of the 12,350 polled were tired of the CCTV New Year's Gala, and that 73% were looking forward to watch the shanzhai version.

See also
Shanzhai
CCTV New Year's Gala
subcultures
kuso

References

Internet video
In Chinese:大中華的“山寨”情結來自何方？

External links
CCSTV Website 
Interview with Shi Mengqi and participants on the CCSTV Gala by Radio 774 
22 Scholars, Lawyers Jointly Boycott (CCTV), Oppose its Brainwashing, Declare "Four No" Policy
Imitation Is the Sincerest Form of Rebellion in China, The Wall Street Journal, January 22, 2009
David vs. Goliath: Battle for TV Viewers on Lunar New Year Eve, Xinhua News Agency, January 24, 2009
"Shanzhai" Gala not Available for Most Chinese People on New Year's Eve, Xinhua News Agency, January 26, 2009

Chinese New Year
Chinese television shows
New Year's television specials
2000s Chinese television series
2010s Chinese television series